Nitty Gritty Dirt Band is an American country rock band. The group has existed in various forms since its founding in Long Beach, California, in 1966. The band’s membership has had at least a dozen changes over the years, including a period from 1976 to 1981 when the band performed and recorded as the Dirt Band. The band is often cited as instrumental to the progression of contemporary country and roots music.

The band's successes include a cover version of Jerry Jeff Walker's "Mr. Bojangles". Albums include 1972's Will the Circle be Unbroken, featuring such traditional country artists as Mother Maybelle Carter, Earl Scruggs, Roy Acuff, Doc Watson, Merle Travis, and Jimmy Martin. A follow-up album based on the same concept, Will the Circle Be Unbroken: Volume Two was released in 1989, was certified gold, won two Grammys, and was named Album of the Year at the Country Music Association Awards.

Studio albums

1960s

1970s

1980s

1990s and 2000s

Collaborations

Live albums

Compilation albums

Singles

1960s and 1970s

1980s

1990s

Other singles

Christmas singles

Notes
A^ "Some of Shelly's Blues" did not chart when first issued on Liberty. United Artists reissued the title in 1971, at which time it charted.
B^ "Make a Little Magic" also peaked at number 26 on the Canadian RPM Adult Contemporary Tracks chart.
C^ The recording of "Fire In The Sky" that charted in 1986 and appeared on the Twenty Years of Dirt album is the same recording that had previously been issued on the Liberty label in 1981. Both the reissued single and aforementioned album ascribe phonographic copyright to Liberty Records.
D^ "Bang, Bang, Bang" was originally released by Rising Tide Records before that label closed; the re-release of the song in 1999 was under DreamWorks Records.

Music videos

DVD & VHS

NGDB as contributing artists

References

Country music discographies
 
 
Discographies of American artists